Algernod Lanier Washington (born July 1, 1976), better known by his stage name Plies, is an American rapper. Born in Fort Myers, Florida, Plies was a wide receiver on the Miami Redskins football team of Miami University in Ohio in 1996 and 1997 before beginning his musical career. After dropping out of college, he was signed to Slip-n-Slide Records, he released four studio albums from 2007 until 2010. Plies debuted in 2007 with The Real Testament with successful singles "Shawty" (featuring T-Pain) and "Hypnotized" (featuring Akon). Plies also released two albums in 2008, Definition of Real and Da REAList, and later released Goon Affiliated in 2010.

Early life 
Plies was born Algernod Lanier Washington in Fort Myers, Florida, and grew up in the East Dunbar area of Fort Myers. While at Fort Myers Senior High School, he played receiver and defensive back in its football team, was crowned Homecoming King, was the valedictorian of his high school class, and was named the "Best Dressed" student of his class.

He attended Miami University and under the name Nod Washington was wide receiver on its football team from 1995 to 1997, then transferred to the University of Central Florida and dropped out. As a freshman in 1995, Washington had 9 receptions for 69 yards. In 1996, his sophomore year, Washington had 25 receptions for 262 yards and 2 touchdowns. The next season, Washington had 5 receptions for 43 yards.

Music career 
In the late 1990s, Plies and his stepbrother Ronnell Lawrence Lavatte, also known as Big Gates, established an independent record label, Big Gates Records. Although Plies initially refused to rap, after a demonstration for one of his artists, Big Gates decided to keep Plies' verse on the track "Tell Dem Krackers Dat". Big Gates and Plies promoted the single and traveled many times to Miami, which eventually led to a deal for Plies on Slip-n-Slide Records. After signing to Slip-n-Slide in 2004, Plies released several mixtapes.

2007: The Real Testament 
The Real Testament was released in August 2007. His debut single "Shawty" featuring T-Pain topped the Billboard Hot Rap Tracks chart and peaked at number 9 on the Hot 100. "Hypnotized", the second single, featured Akon, and peaked at number 3 on the Rap chart and 14 on the Hot 100. The third single was "I Am the Club". On February 29, 2008, the Recording Industry Association of America (RIAA) certified the album Gold for having sold over 500,000 units; five days later the RIAA did the same for singles "Shawty" and "Hypnotized". Plies made guest performances on DJ Khaled's "I'm So Hood", also featuring T-Pain, Trick Daddy and Rick Ross in 2007, which peaked at #19 on the Hot 100 and is included on Khaled second studio album We the Best, and Fat Joe's single "Ain't Sayin' Nothin'" from The Elephant in the Room in early 2008.

2008: Definition of Real and Da REAList 
Definition of Real, his second album, was released in June 2008, 10 months after releasing his first album. The lead single was "Bust It Baby Pt. 2" featuring Ne-Yo, which peaked at number 2 on both the Hot Rap Tracks and Hot R&B/Hip-Hop Singles & Tracks charts and number 7 on the Hot 100. The album debuted at number 2 on the Billboard 200, selling over 214,000 copies its first week. The next single was "Please Excuse My Hands", featuring Jamie Foxx and The-Dream. RIAA certified Gold "Bust It Baby" on September 17 and Definition of Real October 14.

That same year Plies released his third album, Da REAList, in December 2008, six months after the release of his second album. The first single off this album is "Put It on Ya", featuring Chris J. The album debuted at number 14 on the Billboard 200 with 114,000 copies sold in its first week. The second single is "Want It, Need It", featuring Ashanti, and the third is "Plenty Money". He did a guest performance on Ludacris' single "Nasty Girl" from Ludacris' album Theater of the Mind. He also appeared on DJ Khaled's song "Out Here Grindin', also featuring Akon, Ross, Young Jeezy, Lil Boosie, Ace Hood and Trick Daddy, from Khaled's third album We Global, which peaked at #38 on the Hot 100.

2009–2010: Goon Affiliated 
In a November 2008 interview with Plies, and according to Slip-n-Slide Records, the rapper announced he completed a fourth album which he planned to release February 16, 2009, but stated the exact date depended on the success of his third album. The album, Goon Affiliated, ended up being released on June 8, 2010. The album's first two singles are "Becky" and "She Got It Made" featuring Bei Maejor. The album debuted at #5 on the Billboard 200, much more successful than his previous album. He continued to make guest appearances on Usher's "Hey Daddy (Daddy's Home)" (that version not making Usher's sixth studio album Raymond vs. Raymond), Gucci Mane's "Wasted", from The State vs. Radric Davis and Young Jeezy's "Lose My Mind", from Jeezy's fourth album Thug Motivation 103: Hustlerz Ambition, all of which made the top 40 of the Hot 100.

In 2010, Plies released a mixtape titled You Need People Like Me on September 3, which included a song titled "Boosie" dedicated to the incarcerated rapper Lil Boosie. On November 18, he released another mixtape titled You Need People Like Me Pt. 2. On December 23, 2010, he released another mixtape titled No Chaser.

2011–present 
In 2011, Plies released a mixtape titled I Fuck With The DJ on March 15 and a mixtape titled Aristotle on September 1. On May 3, he announced the title for his fifth studio album titled Purple Heart. On September 22, Plies released his first promotional single from the album titled "Just (The Tip)" featuring Jeremih and Ludacris.

In 2012, Plies released a mixtape titled On Trial on February 24, which included the second promotional single from his album Purple Heart titled "With You". On April 17, Plies released a single titled "We Are Trayvon" that was dedicated to Trayvon Martin which all profits from the single be donated to the "Trayvon Martin Foundation".

In 2013, Plies released the promotional single from Purple Heart titled "F**king or What" on July 16 and released the music video for the single on August 22. On September 3, Plies released the promotional single titled "Faithful" featuring singer/songwriter Rico Love.

In 2014, Plies released his mixtape entitled Da Last Real Nigga Left on January 17, and released his mixtape entitled Da Last Real Nigga Left 2 on November 13.

On February 11, 2015, Plies released the first single off of his upcoming fifth album Purple Heart titled "Find You" featuring appearances from K Camp and Lil Wayne. On April 29, Plies released the second single titled "Dayum!", the single is known for Plies addressing the controversy surrounding him getting attacked on stage. On August 8, Plies released a mixtape titled Ain't No Mixtape Bih. On November 19, he released the mixtape Ain't No Mixtape BIH 2.

On January 29, 2016, Plies released a single entitled "Ran Off on da Plug Twice", originally titled "Ritz Carlton", and was included on his mixtape Ain't No Mixtape BIH 2, the music video for the single would be released on November 19, 2015, and would go on to become viral & the single would go on to chart at number forty-two on the Billboard Hot R&B/Hip-Hop Songs. On October 27, 2016, Plies released the single titled "Rich N*gga Shit", the music video for the single would be released on September 2, 2016. On December 13 Plies released the single entitled "Racks Up to My Ear" featuring Young Dolph.

Persona 
David Jeffries of AllMusic described Plies's debut album The Real Testament as tracks covering both gang life and love. Similarly, Jeffries described the lyrical content of Da REAList as having "a spectrum that runs from irresponsible gun talk to irresponsible sex talk". A profile of Plies in the December 2008 issue of Vibe magazine observed that Plies constantly referred to himself as "real" in his music and album titles. However, it pointed out that the word "has virtually synonymous with 'criminal' and, in some cases, almost superseded the idea of being able to actually rap". In July 2008, hip hop website HipHopDX published an investigative report suggesting that Plies exaggerated his criminal background.

Personal life 
Plies' girlfriend Brandy Lacole Lyons gave birth to a son at the University Community Hospital in Tampa, Florida on October 20, 2003. Between 2015–16, Plies gained a notable following as an Instagram personality for his comedic approach to lifestyle advice and other topics.

Legal issues 
On July 2, 2006, after a shooting at a Gainesville, Florida nightclub, Plies was charged with illegal possession of a concealed weapon, and members of his entourage were charged with attempted murder. The shooting, in which 5 people were injured, started after Plies' microphone was cut off for Lil Boosie to perform, after Plies' performance ran over time. According to the promoter Jonathan Smith, Plies became "enraged". A fight began with fists and shouting, and ended with at least six rounds of bullets being fired.

In January 2017, Plies was arrested in Wesley Chapel, Florida for driving under the influence. Plies refused a roadside blood alcohol content test and was taken into custody.

Concert altercation 
On April 3, 2015, a viral video of Plies getting attacked on stage during a concert in Tallahassee, Florida was released, the attacker would later address the situation stating "I fuck with you bruh, that nigga is one of my top five artists, that nigga started talking that bullshit. So I dropped his ass like any real nigga would do like bitch, fuck you bruh.". On April 29, 2015, Plies would release a single titled "Dayum!" addressing the attack.

Discography 

 The Real Testament (2007)
 Definition of Real (2008)
 Da REAList (2008)
 Goon Affiliated (2010)

Awards and nominations 
 BET Hip-Hop Awards
 2008: Ringtone of the Year ("Bust It Baby Pt 2" with Ne-Yo) (Nominated)
 2008: People's Champ Award ("Bust It Baby Pt 2" with Ne-Yo) (Nominated)
 2008: Best Collaboration ("Bust It Baby Pt 2" with Ne-Yo) (Nominated)
 Ozone Awards
 2007: Best Rap/R&B Collaboration ("Shawty" with T-Pain) (Won)
 2008: Best Rap Album (The Real Testament) (Nominated)
 2008: Best Rap/R&B Collaboration ("Bust It Baby Pt. 2" with Ne-Yo) (Nominated)
 2008: Club Banger of the Year ("I'm So Hood" with DJ Khaled, Trick Daddy, T-Pain and Rick Ross) (Nominated)
 Grammy Awards
 2011: Best Rap Performance By A Duo Or Group ("Lose My Mind" with Young Jeezy) (Nominated)

References

External links 
 
 

1976 births
Living people
African-American businesspeople
African-American players of American football
African-American male rappers
American football wide receivers
American music industry executives
Atlantic Records artists
Businesspeople from Florida
Miami RedHawks football players
People from Fort Myers, Florida
Players of American football from Florida
Rappers from Florida
Southern hip hop musicians
University of Central Florida alumni
Gangsta rappers
21st-century American rappers
21st-century American male musicians
21st-century African-American musicians
20th-century African-American sportspeople